Villa Serrano is a small town in the Chuquisaca Department, Bolivia. It is the seat of the Belisario Boeto Province. At the time of census 2001 it had 2,877 inhabitants.

The town is famous for its Christmas celebration, when people dance many "Chuntunquis" in honor of the Jesus Christ's birth.

During September 2019, Villa Serrano started to be consumed into burn. People asked for help to the Bolivian government but it was not given.

References

Populated places in Chuquisaca Department